Langley House is a Grade II* listed house in Kings Langley, Hertfordshire, England. It dates from the late 16th century, with later additions.

References

Grade II* listed buildings in Hertfordshire
Grade II* listed houses
Dacorum